The 2013 Badminton Asia Championships was the 32nd edition of the Badminton Asia Championships. It was held in Taipei, Taiwan, from April 16 to April 21.

Venue
Taipei Arena.

Medalists

Results

Men's singles

Seeds

  Chen Long (final)
  Du Pengyu (champion)
  Hu Yun (2nd Round)
  Parupalli Kashyap (3rd Round)
  Nguyễn Tiến Minh (1st Round)
  Wang Zhengming (semi-final)
  Boonsak Ponsana (quarter-final)
  Sho Sasaki (withdrew)
  Liew Daren (3rd Round)
  Chong Wei Feng (semi-final)
  Wong Wing Ki (3rd Round)
  Takuma Ueda (2nd Round)
  Chou Tien-chen (2nd Round)
  Tanongsak Saensomboonsuk
  Gao Huan (quarter-final)
  Hsu Jen-hao (2nd Round)

Finals

Top Half

Section 1

Section 2

Section 3

Section 4

Bottom Half

Section 5

Section 6

Section 7

Section 8

Women's singles

Seeds

  Li Xuerui (final)
  Wang Yihan (champion)
  Wang Shixian (2nd Round)
  Ratchanok Intanon (quarter-final)
  Tai Tzu-ying (quarter-final)
  Bae Yeon-ju (2nd Round)
  Eriko Hirose (semi-final)
  Jiang Yanjiao (2nd Round)

Finals

Top Half

Bottom Half

Men's doubles

Seeds

  Ko Sung-hyun / Lee Yong-dae (champion)
  Hiroyuki Endo / Kenichi Hayakawa (semi-final)
  Kim Ki-jung / Kim Sa-rang (final)
  Hong Wei / Shen Ye (quarter-final)
  Chai Biao / Guo Zhendong (2nd Round)
  Mohammad Ahsan / Hendra Setiawan (withdrew)
  Liu Xiaolong / Qiu Zihan (quarter-final)
  Hirokatsu Hashimoto / Noriyasu Hirata (2nd Round)

Finals

Top Half

Bottom Half

-->

Women's doubles

Seeds

  Wang Xiaoli / Yu Yang (gold medalist)
  Misaki Matsutomo / Ayaka Takahashi (first round)
  Jung Kyung-Eun / Kim Ha-Na (first round)
  Miyuki Maeda / Satoko Suetsuna (quarter-finals)
  Ma Jin / Tang Jinhua (silver medalist)
  Duanganong Aroonkesorn / Kunchala Voravichitchaikul (first round)
  Pia Zebadiah Bernadet / Rizki Amelia Pradipta (withdrew)
  Lam Narissapat / Saralee Thoungthongkam (first round)

Finals

Top Half

Section 1

Section 2

Bottom Half

Section 3

Section 4

Mixed doubles

Seeds

  Xu Chen / Ma Jin (withdrew)
  Zhang Nan / Zhao Yunlei (silver medalist)
  Sudket Prapakamol / Saralee Thoungthongkam (quarter-finals)
  Markis Kido / Pia Zebadiah Bernadet (second round)
  Fran Kurniawan / Shendy Puspa Irawati (bronze medalist)
  Danny Bawa Chrisnanta / Vanessa Neo Yu Yan (first round)
  Kenichi Hayakawa / Misaki Matsutomo (first round)
  Valiyaveetil Diju / Jwala Gutta (withdrew)

Finals

Top Half

Section 1

Section 2

Bottom Half

Section 3

Section 4

See also
 List of sporting events in Taiwan

References

External links
Badminton Asia Championships 2013 at tournamentsoftware.com

Badminton Asia Championships
Asian Badminton Championships
Badminton tournaments in Taiwan
2013 in Taiwanese sport